The Royal Bank of Scotland International, trading under the NatWest International (retail), RBS International (institutional), Coutts Crown Dependencies (wealth management) and Isle of Man Bank brands, is the offshore banking arm of NatWest Group. It provides a range of services to personal, business, commercial, corporate and financial intermediary customers from its base in St. Helier, Jersey.

History

Royal Bank of Scotland
The Royal Bank of Scotland first began offering services to customers in offshore jurisdictions through Williams Deacon Bank, its London and Manchester-based subsidiary, in 1963. RBS International was founded as Williams Deacons Investment and Finance Limited in 1966, becoming Williams & Glyn's Bank Investments (Jersey) Limited in 1970, Williams & Glyn's Bank (Jersey) Limited in 1982 and The Royal Bank of Scotland (Jersey) Limited in 1985, before adopting the present name in 2003. The Royal Bank of Scotland International was first registered as a trading name in 1995 and The Royal Bank of Scotland International (Holdings) Limited was formed in 1996.

The undertaking of The Royal Bank of Scotland (Gibraltar) Limited, which carried on business in Gibraltar under the NatWest and RBS International brands, was transferred to RBS International in 2009.

National Westminster Bank

NatWest Offshore Limited was an Isle of Man-incorporated bank formed in 1997, with branches in Jersey, Guernsey and Gibraltar. The business was transferred to RBS International through private members' legislation passed in each of the four jurisdictions in 2001, with RBS retaining NatWest as a trading name as well as continuing its existing business.

National Westminster International Holdings BV is the holding company for National Westminster Services (Ireland) Limited (Dublin), RBS Deutschland Holdings GmbH (Frankfurt) and RBS Netherlands Holdings BV (Houten).

Isle of Man Bank
In 2019, the High Court of Justice of the Isle of Man granted approval for the transfer of the business of Isle of Man Bank Limited to the Isle of Man branch of RBS International, trading as Isle of Man Bank.

Operations
Headquartered in Jersey, RBS International has a presence in Gibraltar, Guernsey, the Isle of Man, Luxembourg and the United Kingdom. The bank is regulated by the Jersey Financial Services Commission; the Gibraltar branch is regulated and authorised by the Financial Services Commission, Gibraltar to undertake banking and investment business; the Guernsey branch is regulated by the Guernsey Financial Services Commission and licensed under the Banking Supervision (Bailiwick of Guernsey) Law, 1994, as amended, the Insurance Managers and Insurance Intermediaries (Bailiwick of Guernsey) Law, 2002, and the Protection of Investors (Bailiwick of Guernsey) Law, 1987, as amended; and the Isle of Man branch is licensed by the Isle of Man Financial Services Authority in respect of deposit taking, investment business and registered as a general insurance intermediary.

Structure
Financial services are provided through local and institutional banking customer segments. Local banking provides loan and deposit products and services to personal, private, business and commercial customers. Institutional banking provides services to European fund asset managers, fund administrators and corporate service providers.

In 2022, NatWest Group announced the creation of Commercial and Institutional, which brought together the Commercial, NatWest Markets and RBS International customer businesses as a new operating segment.

Services
In 2012, it was announced that all personal banking customers would be migrated to the NatWest brand, while business, commercial and corporate banking customers would remain under the RBS International brand. The NatWest trading name was changed to NatWest International in 2017, due to new ring-fencing legislation in the UK.

See also

NatWest Markets
Ulster Bank

References

External links

NatWest International
Coutts Crown Dependencies

NatWest Group
Companies of Jersey
Banks established in 1996
1996 establishments in Jersey